Blanchard is the suburban town in, and the second-largest municipality by population of Caddo Parish in the U.S. state of Louisiana. With a population of 3,538 at the 2020 U.S. census, it is part of the Shreveport–Bossier City metropolitan statistical area.

History
Blanchard was likely named for Newton C. Blanchard, a United States Representative, Senator, and the 33rd Governor of Louisiana.

Geography
Blanchard is located at  (32.586762, -93.887590). Louisiana Highway 173 passes through the town as Main Street.

Demographics

According to the 2020 United States census, there were 3,538 people, 1,277 households, and 944 families residing in the town, overtaking Vivian as the second-largest incorporated municipality in Caddo Parish. Prior to the 2020 census, Blanchard was the fourth-most populous community in the parish, behind Greenwood with a 2010 population of 2,899. As of the census of 2000, there were 2,682 people, 787 households, and 602 families residing in the town.

In 2000, the racial makeup of the town was 95.32% White, 2.93% African American, 0.54% Native American, 0.39% Asian, 0.10% Pacific Islander, 0.10% from other races, and 0.63% from two or more races. Hispanic or Latino of any race were 0.59% of the population. Following nationwide trends of diversification in 2020, the racial makeup of Blanchard was 75.98% non-Hispanic white, 14.84% African American, 0.62% Native American, 0.71% Asian, 0.11% Pacific Islander, 4.49% mixed or other race, and 3.25% Hispanic or Latino of any race.

The median income for a household in the town was $44,750, and the median income for a family was $58,047 per the 2000 census. Males had a median income of $41,161 versus $26,161 for females. The per capita income for the town was $22,391. About 2.8% of families and 5.2% of the population were below the poverty line, including 3.1% of those under age 18 and 13.7% of those age 65 or over. At the publication of the 2020 American Community Survey, the median household income increased to $80,972. Its mean income was $87,881, making it one of the wealthiest communities in North Louisiana and Caddo Parish overall.

Notable people
 Elle Evans, former Miss Teen Louisiana 2008; "Miss October 2009" Playmate for Playboy
 Hal Sutton, professional golfer
 Ollie Tyler, former Caddo Parish school superintendent and interim Louisiana State Education Superintendent; Shreveport mayor, born in Blanchard in 1945

References

External links
Town of Blanchard official website

Towns in Caddo Parish, Louisiana
Towns in Louisiana
Towns in Shreveport – Bossier City metropolitan area